is a Japanese slang term for single males which originated on the 2channel internet textboard.

References

Society of Japan
Japanese words and phrases
Neologisms